Turunç is a Turkish holiday resort situated in the Marmaris district of Muğla Province, Turkey.

The area is a former fishing village, and has been populated since ancient times as the sea offers a variety of precious resources. Despite the region's fast development in recent years, the natural environment of Turunç has been preserved. As a resort, the village has won the Blue Flag award in recognition of its clean beach and water quality. 
The waterfront features restaurants, bazaars and bars. However, due to the nature of the resort there are few exclusively adult establishments.

The climate is warm, and enables the tourist season to be 7 months a year from April to October.

Infrastructure
The closest airport is Dalaman Airport.

The road to the town passes through the Taurus Mountains, and has a very low speed limit. To reach Turunç from Marmaris is about 20 minutes by car.

Nearby cities include: Icmeler and Marmaris. Both of which are popular with holidaymakers.

References

External links

Populated places in Muğla Province
Populated coastal places in Turkey
Towns in Turkey
Turkish Riviera
Tourist attractions in Muğla Province
Seaside resorts in Turkey